Mikulášovice is a town in Děčín District in the Ústí nad Labem Region of the Czech Republic. It has about 2,100 inhabitants.

Administrative parts
Villages of Mikulášovičky, Salmov and Tomášov are administrative parts of Mikulášovice.

Geography

It lies in the salient region of Šluknov Hook, on the border with Germany, adjacent to the municipal territory of Sebnitz.

Mikulášovice is situated in the Lusatian Highlands. The town lies in the elongated valley of the Mikulášovický Brook.

History
The first written mention of Mikulášovice is from 1446. The village was founded in the 12th century. In the 18th century, it was already an industrial municipality with tradition in knives sharpening. In 1794, the production of knives began.

From 1938 to 1945 it was occupied by Germany, before it was liberated by Polish soldiers in May 1945 and restored to Czechoslovakia. In the final stages of World War II, in May 1945, the prisoners of the AL Bautzen subcamp of the Gross-Rosen concentration camp, evacuated from Bautzen to Mikulášovice by the Germans, were liberated there by Polish soldiers.

Economy
The company Mikov, producing the popular knife Rybička, has its seat in Mikulášovice.

Notable people
Franz Dittrich (1815–1859), pathologist
Anni Frind (1900–1987), soprano opera singer
Oskar Schäfer (1921–2011), Knight's Cross holder

Gallery

References

External links

Cities and towns in the Czech Republic
Populated places in Děčín District